Daxu is a town in Xiangshan County, Zhejiang Province, China. , it administers the following 24 villages:
Daxu Village
Jiatiannong Village
Tangjiadian Village
Xiangsiling Village
Daleitou Village
Huangpen'ao Village
Linshan'ao Village
Houlin Village
Zhangjianong Village
Yalinxi Village
Xia'ao Village
Shang'ao Village
Xinluo'ao Village
Huxiaopu Village
Xiayu'ao Village
Likaokeng Village
Haikou Village
Sanjiaodi Village
Andong Village
Tazhuang Village
Xiayuan Village
Shanmuyang Village
Chenshan Village
Tieshi Village

References

Xiangshan County, Zhejiang
Township-level divisions of Zhejiang